George Graham (born 1944) is a Scottish former football player and manager.

George Graham may also refer to:

Politics 
Lord George Graham (1715–1747), naval officer, MP for Stirlingshire
George Graham (Northern Ireland politician) (1945–2012), Northern Ireland Democratic Unionist Party politician
George Graham (Scottish MP) (1730–1801), MP for Clackmannanshire and Kinross-shire, Lord Lieutenant of Kinross-shire
George Graham (soldier) (1772–1830), Virginia lawyer and legislator, interim U.S. Secretary of War and commissioner of the General Land Office, father of George Mason Graham
George Graham (New Zealand politician) (1812–1901), New Zealand politician
George Graham (Victorian politician) (1838–1922), member of the Victorian Legislative Assembly
George Graham (New South Wales politician) (fl. 1861), member of the New South Wales Legislative Council
George Scott Graham (1850–1931), U.S. Representative from Pennsylvania
George Perry Graham (1859–1943), Canadian MP from Ontario
George G. Graham (born 1931), former Chairman of the South Carolina Republican Party
George J. Graham Jr. (1938–2006), political theorist
George Graham (North Carolina politician) (born 1949), member of the North Carolina General Assembly

Sports
George Graham (Australian footballer) (1903–1983), Australian rules footballer
George Graham (mountaineer), first ascent of Aoraki / Mount Cook
George Graham (rugby) (born 1966), rugby player for Scotland and Newcastle Falcons
George Graham (soccer, born 1902) (1902–1966), Irish-Canadian soccer player

Others 
George Graham (bishop) (died 1643), Scottish bishop
George Graham (clockmaker) (1673–1751), English clockmaker, geophysicist, and inventor
George Graham (ethnographer) (1874–1952), New Zealand accountant, lawyer and ethnographer
George Graham (monologist) (1866–1903), American monologist, patent medicine salesman, and recording artist
George Graham (physician) (1882–1971), English physician and physiologist
George Graham (Registrar General), Registrar General of England and Wales (1842–1880)
George Farquhar Graham (1789–1867), Scottish musicologist
George Mason Graham (1807–1891), first chairman of the board of trustees of the Louisiana State Seminary of Learning, forerunner of Louisiana State University
George Rex Graham (1813–1894), founder of Graham's Magazine in Philadelphia

See also